Cameron Curtis is an Australian lawn & indoor bowler and coach.

Bowls career

International
Cameron won the 1994 World Indoor Bowls Championship partnering Ian Schuback. In the same year he won the Pairs Gold Medal at the 1994 Commonwealth Games in Victoria, Canada.
Curtis became the national coach for Australia and led the team to a record medal haul at the 2006 Commonwealth Games.

He won a gold and silver medal at the 1993 Asia Pacific Bowls Championships, in Victoria, Canada.

National
Curtis won the 1990 Australian National Bowls Championships in the fours.

References

Australian male bowls players
Living people
1971 births
Commonwealth Games medallists in lawn bowls
Commonwealth Games gold medallists for Australia
Indoor Bowls World Champions
Bowls players at the 1994 Commonwealth Games
20th-century Australian people
Medallists at the 1994 Commonwealth Games